Elizabeth Carey may refer to:

Elizabeth Carey (social activist) (1835–1920), Canadian  social activist
Elizabeth Danvers (1545/50–1630), née Neville, Carey by her 2nd marriage, Tudor English noblewoman
Elizabeth Carey, Lady Berkeley (1576–1635), noblewoman and patron of the arts, daughter of Baroness Hunsdon
Elizabeth Cary, Viscountess Falkland (née Tanfield; 1585–1639), English poet, dramatist, translator, and historian
Elizabeth Spencer, Baroness Hunsdon (1552–1618), Carey by her second marriage
Betty Lowman Carey (1914–2011), rower

See also
Elizabeth Cary (disambiguation)